Jens Björklund (30 December 1910 – 10 January 2000) was a Swedish weightlifter. He competed in the men's lightweight event at the 1936 Summer Olympics.

References

1910 births
2000 deaths
Swedish male weightlifters
Olympic weightlifters of Sweden
Weightlifters at the 1936 Summer Olympics
Sportspeople from Västerås